Tamin Rural District is a rural district (dehestan) in the Central District of Mirjaveh County, in Sistan and Baluchestan Province, Iran. At the 2006 census, its population was 8,353, in 1,695 families.  The rural district has 68 villages.

References 

Rural Districts of Sistan and Baluchestan Province
Mirjaveh County